Dilliner is an unincorporated community in Greene County, Pennsylvania, United States. Dilliner has a post office with ZIP code 15327.

References

Unincorporated communities in Greene County, Pennsylvania
Unincorporated communities in Pennsylvania